is a subway station on the Toei Mita Line in Toshima, Tokyo, Japan, operated by Tokyo Metropolitan Bureau of Transportation (Toei). It is numbered "I-16".

Lines
Nishi-sugamo Station is served by the Toei Mita Line. On maps, it is marked as an interchange with the Tokyo Sakura Tram at Shin-koshinzuka Station.

Platforms
The platform is an island platform serving two tracks.

History
The station opened on 27 December 1968.

External links
 Toei station information

Railway stations in Japan opened in 1968
Railway stations in Tokyo
Toei Mita Line